Fabrice Metz (born 23 January 1991) is a French professional rugby union player. His regular playing position is lock for Section Paloise in the Top 14.

Fabrice Metz has also played for the following teams: Oyonnax, Pau, France (national).

References

External links
Ligue Nationale De Rugby Profile 
European Professional Club Rugby Profile 
Racing Metro Profile 

Living people
1991 births
French rugby union players
Rugby union locks
Racing 92 players
Sportspeople from Strasbourg
Oyonnax Rugby players
France international rugby union players
Section Paloise players